The Chip Chap River (meaning: "quiet river") is a tributary of the Shyok River that flows from the disputed Aksai Chin region administered by China to Ladakh in India. It originates at the eastern edge of the Depsang Plains and flows west, skirting around the Depsang Plains in the north. It discharges into the Shyok River, forming one of the upstream tributaries of the Indus River.

The old caravan route between Leh and Yarkand passed through the Depsang Plains crossing the Chip Chap River. Daulat Beg Oldi on the northern bank of the river en route to the Karakoram Pass used to be a regular halting place. Although the trading caravans came to an end in the 1950s, the route continues to be a popular trekking trail.

Course 

The main stream of the Chip Chap River flows westwards along the northern edge of the Depsang Plains. The upper course of the river is in a relatively flat area with a drop of only 190 metres over 30 km. Several mountain streams from the south drain into the relatively stagnant pool of water in this area. Near Tianwendian more streams from the Depsang Plans join the river, bringing in water from the high mountains of Karakoram range to the west. Near the Line of Actual Control that separates the Indian- and Chinese-controlled portions of Depsang Plains, the Lungnak Lungpa stream joins from north. Another stream passing by Daulat Beg Oldi joins the river in the Indian controlled area. The combined river joins the Shyok at an elevation of 4800 m.

The 1899 British offer to China for the border in Aksai Chin (the Macartney–MacDonald Line) placed the entire course of the Chip Chap River in the Indian territory. The 1956 claim line of China also did the same. But by 1960, China advanced its claim line to include a major portion of the Chip Chap river, coming within 4 miles of Daulat Beg Oldi.

Sino-Indian border dispute 

The Chip Chap river valley played a key role in the evolution of the border conflict between China and India in 1961–62. In September 1961 India discovered that China had established a military post in the Chip Chap valley four miles east of the Indian post at Daulat Beg Oldi.  China had also constructed a motorable road leading to the post. Finally, the Chinese troops attempted to capture an Indian patrol in the area. India concluded that China was attempting to extend its control to its 1960 claim line.

In response, the Indian government evolved a policy that  came to be called the 'forward policy'. The government directed the Indian army to patrol as far towards the international border as possible, asking it to establish posts so as to prevent the Chinese from advancing any further west. In March–April 1962, the Indian army created posts in the Chip Chap valley as well as Depsang Plains to prevent Chinese incursions.

In May 1962 a stand-off occurred as the Chinese troops moved toward an Indian post, giving every indication of intending to attack. The army asked if it should withdraw, but the Prime Minister Jawaharlal Nehru asked it to hold firm and not submit to the threat of force. The Chinese troops eventually withdrew. Following a similar standoff in the Galwan valley, the commanders in Ladakh were authorised to fire on Chinese if they came too close. This happened in September 1962. When the Chinese troops came close to one of the Indian posts, the Indians opened fire at "point-blank range", killing several men. The Indian government arranged for the bodies to be returned to the Chinese without generating any publicity. This was perhaps the last major clash before the breakout of open hostilities on 20 October, after which all the Indian posts were attacked with major force and neutralised. By the end of the Sino-Indian War of 1962, the Chinese forces had occupied all the territory up to their 1960 claim line.

Notes

References

Bibliography

Further reading

External links
 Maps of Ladakh, Bame Duniya blogspot, 19 March 2013

Tributaries of the Indus River
Rivers of Ladakh
Rivers of Xinjiang
Rivers of India
Aksai Chin